The 2008–09 All-Ireland Intermediate Club Hurling Championship was the fifth staging of the All-Ireland Intermediate Club Hurling Championship since its establishment by the Gaelic Athletic Association in 2004.

The All-Ireland final was played on 15 February 2009 at Croke Park in Dublin, between Blarney from Cork and Cappataggle from Galway. Blarney won the match by 2-14 to 1-12 to claim their first ever All-Ireland title.

Leinster Intermediate Club Hurling Championship

Leinster final

Munster Intermediate Club Hurling Championship

Munster quarter-finals

Munster semi-finals

Munster final

All-Ireland Intermediate Club Hurling Championship

All-Ireland final

Championship statistics

Miscellaneous

 Gort na Móna became the first club to win the Ulster Championship twice.

References

All-Ireland Intermediate Club Hurling Championship
All-Ireland Intermediate Club Hurling Championship
All-Ireland Intermediate Club Hurling Championship